Colobosauroides is a small genus of lizards in the family Gymnophthalmidae. The genus Colobosauroides is endemic to Brazil.

Geographic range
Species in the genus Colobosauroides are found in northeastern Brazil, in the Brazilian states of Bahia and Ceará.

Species
The genus Colobosauroides includes only the following two species:

Colobosauroides carvalhoi M. Soares & Caramaschi, 1998
Colobosauroides cearensis da Cunha, Lima-Verde & Lima, 1991

Etymology
The specific name, carvalhoi, is in honor of Brazilian herpetologist Antenor Leitão de Carvalho.

References

Further reading
da Cunha OR, Lima-Verde JS, Lima ACM (1991). "Novo genero e espécie de lagarto do Estado do Ceará (Lacertilia: Teiidae)". Boletim Museu Paraense Emílio Goeldi, Nova Série Zoologia 7 (2): 163–176. (Colobosauroides, new genus; C. cearensis, new species). (in Portuguese).
Soares M, Caramaschi U (1998). "Espécie nova de Colobosauroides Cunha, Lima-Verde & Lima, 1991 do estado da Bahia, Brasil (Squamata, Sauria, Gymnophthalmidae)". Bol. Mus. Nac. Nov. Sér., Rio de Janeiro 388: 1–8. (Colobosauroides carvalhoi, new species). (in Portuguese).

 
Lizard genera
Taxa named by Osvaldo Rodrigues da Cunha
Taxa named by José Santiago Lima-Verde
Taxa named by Almira Cláudia Marinho Lima
Endemic fauna of Brazil